The Laurence Olivier Award for Best Musical Revival is an annual award presented by the Society of London Theatre in recognition of achievements in commercial London theatre. The awards were established as the Society of West End Theatre Awards in 1976, and renamed in 1984 in honour of English actor and director Laurence Olivier.

This award was introduced in 1991. From 1997 to 2007, the award was presented as Outstanding Musical Production.

Winners and nominees

1990s

2000s

2010s

2020s

Multiple awards and nominations

Awards
Two awards
Sweeney Todd

Nominations
Four nominations

 Cabaret
Three nominations
Joseph and the Amazing Technicolor Dreamcoat
Kiss Me Kate
Show Boat
South Pacific
Sweeney Todd

Two nominations
Annie Get Your Gun
Anything Goes
Evita
Fiddler on the Roof
A Funny Thing Happened on the Way to the Forum
Guys and Dolls
H.M.S. Pinafore
Into the Woods
Jesus Christ Superstar
The King and I
My Fair Lady
Oklahoma!
Oliver!
Singin' in the Rain
The Sound of Music
Sunset Boulevard
Tell Me on a Sunday

See also
 Critics' Circle Award for Best Musical
 Evening Standard Theatre Award for Best Musical
 Tony Award for Best Revival of a Musical

References

External links
 

Musical